Chrysal Creek is a creek in the Moira River and Lake Ontario drainage basins in Belleville and Quinte West, Hastings County, Ontario, Canada.

Course
It flows south and is crossed by the former Ontario Highway 14. It continues east and splits into two branches at the point where a Hydro One transmission line crosses. The Moira flows into the Bay of Quinte in downtown Belleville.

See also
List of rivers of Ontario

References

Rivers of Hastings County